Cryptodiaporthe is a genus of fungi in the family Gnomoniaceae. The genus contains 24 species.

References

External links 

 Cryptodiaporthe at Index Fungorum

Gnomoniaceae
Sordariomycetes genera
Taxa named by Franz Petrak